Achim Kessler (born 2 August 1964) is a German politician. Born in Sankt Georgen im Schwarzwald, Baden-Württemberg, he represents The Left. Achim Kessler has served as a member of the Bundestag from the state of Hesse from 2017 to October 2021.

Life 
After his civilian service in the Workers' Welfare Association in Villingen-Schwenningen in 1986, he studied Modern German Literature and Media Studies as well as Economic and Social History in Marburg. Since 2005 he was a constituency employee of Wolfgang Gehrcke, member of the Bundestag. From 2006 to 2011, Kessler was an honorary city councilor of the city of Frankfurt. He became a member of the Bundestag after the 2017 German federal election. He is a member of the Health Committee. For his group he is spokesman for health policy.

References

External links 

  
 Bundestag biography 

1964 births
Living people
Members of the Bundestag for Hesse
Members of the Bundestag 2017–2021
Members of the Bundestag for The Left
LGBT members of the Bundestag
Gay politicians
21st-century LGBT people